The following events occurred in March 1924:

March 1, 1924 (Saturday)
The Nixon Nitration Works disaster killed at least 18 people and destroyed several miles of New Jersey factories.
The Communist Party of Germany was legally reinstated. It had been banned in November 1923 after it tried to launch a general strike. 
Alice's Day at Sea was the first film in Walt Disney's Alice Comedies series to be shown theatrically.
Born: Deke Slayton, U.S. astronaut; in Sparta, Wisconsin (d. 1993)

March 2, 1924 (Sunday)
Cardinal Désiré-Joseph Mercier of Belgium issued a pastoral letter calling on Belgians to help their government restore the country's finances.
Public vehicles were allowed into London's Hyde Park for the first time since 1636.

March 3, 1924 (Monday)
Shefqet Vërlaci became the new Prime Minister of Albania due to Ahmet Zogu's serious injury in the assassination attempt of February 23.
The Turkish National Assembly formally abolished the Caliphate.
Seán O'Casey's drama Juno and the Paycock opened at the Abbey Theatre, Dublin.
Born: Lys Assia, singer and first winner of the Eurovision Song Contest, in Aargau, Switzerland (d. 2018); Tomiichi Murayama, Prime Minister of Japan, in Ōita, Japan; Lilian Velez, actress and singer, in Cebu City, Philippines (d. 1948); John Woodnutt, actor, in London, England (d. 2006)

March 4, 1924 (Tuesday)
A magnitude 7.0 earthquake hit Orotina, Costa Rica, killing 70.
Born: Kenneth O'Donnell, aide to President John F. Kennedy, in Worcester, Massachusetts (d. 1977)

March 5, 1924 (Wednesday)
Just two days after Turkey abolished the caliphate, Sharif Husyan proclaimed himself Caliph of all Muslims. The response throughout the Muslim world was mostly negative.

March 6, 1924 (Thursday)
The 2nd government of Turkey began.

March 7, 1924 (Friday)
Rebels surrendered all over Mexico as President Álvaro Obregón offered an amnesty.
Born: Kōbō Abe, writer, in Kita, Tokyo, Japan (d. 1993)
Died: Pat Moran, 48, American baseball player

March 8, 1924 (Saturday)
The Castle Gate Mine disaster occurred near Castle Gate, Utah. All 171 miners were killed in two explosions.
Inventor Nikola Tesla spoke out for the first time in years, announcing he had perfected a system of transmitting power without wires.

March 9, 1924 (Sunday)
The French Cabinet held an emergency meeting to consider extraordinary measures to stabilize the collapsing franc, which dropped to 117 against the British pound.
Died: Panagiotis Danglis, 70 or 71, Greek military leader and politician

March 10, 1924 (Monday)
Edwin Denby resigned as Secretary of the Navy over the Teapot Dome scandal. By quitting before he could be fired, he said he was "dying with my face toward the enemy."
France obtained a $50 million credit from American banks and a £5 million credit from London to stabilize the franc. 
The U.S. Supreme Court upheld a New York state statute banning late-night working for women on grounds of health.
Died: Rafael López Gutiérrez, 68 or 69, President of Honduras

March 11, 1924 (Tuesday)
The worst Atlantic gale in twenty years hit the east coast of the United States, downing telephone and telegraph lines and killing nine.
Born: Bill Ezinicki, hockey player, in Winnipeg, Manitoba, Canada (d. 2012)

March 12, 1924 (Wednesday)
Adolfo de la Huerta, leader of the failed Mexican rebellion against President Álvaro Obregón, went into exile to Florida.

March 13, 1924 (Thursday)
German Chancellor Wilhelm Marx dissolved the Reichstag ahead of a general election to be held on May 4.

March 14, 1924 (Friday)
A League of Nations committee spearheaded by American diplomat Norman Davis reached a settlement on the question of the administration of the Klaipėda Region (Memelland in German), leading to the signing of the Klaipėda Convention two months later.
Fighting broke out in Honduras in the wake of the death of President Rafael López Gutiérrez, initiated by rebels who opposed the new President Francisco Bueso.

March 15, 1924 (Saturday)
King Victor Emmanuel III of Italy gave the warrior-poet Gabriele D'Annunzio the title of Prince of Montenevoso.
England beat Scotland, 19 to 0, to clinch a perfect 4–0 record in the Five Nations Championship rugby tournament and complete a Grand Slam.
Kenya held a legislative election, the first under its new Constitution.
Born: Walter Gotell, actor, in Bonn, Germany (d. 1997)
Died: Daniel Ridgway Knight, 84, American artist

March 16, 1924 (Sunday)
Italy formally annexed Fiume in a colorful ceremony. Crowds cheered as King Victor Emmanuel III read the annexation decree.
Born: Wolfgang Kieling, born in Berlin, German actor (d. 1985)
Died: Robert Lincoln Poston, 33, African-American newspaper editor and journalist (lobar pneumonia)

March 17, 1924 (Monday)
Athlone Town defeated Fordsons 1-0 to win the Football Association of Ireland Cup.
France defeated Sweden 2-1 to win the Ice Hockey European Championship.

March 18, 1924 (Tuesday)
The swashbuckling film The Thief of Bagdad, starring Douglas Fairbanks, was released.

March 19, 1924 (Wednesday)
Winston Churchill of the Constitutionalists lost the Westminster Abbey by-election by 43 votes to Unionist candidate Otho Nicholson.
Died: Nathan Clifford Ricker, 80, American professor and architect

March 20, 1924 (Thursday)
The Virginia General Assembly passed the Racial Integrity Act, enforcing the one-drop rule. 
Died: Carl Hertz, 64, American magician

March 21, 1924 (Friday)
A British soldier was killed and 21 wounded at Queenstown, Ireland when four men in a motor car dressed as Irish army officers drove past the destroyer  and opened fire with a machine gun.
London drivers of trams and public buses went on strike.
Born: Harry Lehmann, physicist, in Güstrow, Germany (d. 1998)

March 22, 1924 (Saturday)
The ocean liner  collided with the smaller liner Fort St George in New York City. The damage required repairs to the extent of which had never been attempted on a ship the size of Olympic before. 
Born: Ivan Minatti, poet, in Slovenske Konjice, Kingdom of Yugoslavia (d. 2012); Yevgeny Ostashev, test pilot of rocket and space complexes, in Maly Vasilyev, USSR (d. 1960)
Died: Louis Delluc, 33, French filmmaker; Robert Nivelle, 67, French military commander

March 23, 1924 (Sunday)
Benito Mussolini presided over a Fascist parade in Rome commemorating the fifth anniversary of the founding of the Fasci Italiani da Combattimento. Mussolini's commemorative speech doubled as a campaign speech for the upcoming general election as he listed his government's accomplishments.

March 24, 1924 (Monday)
The U.S. House of Representatives voted to appropriate $10 million for the purchase of food supplies for poor women and children in Germany.
The films Secrets, starring Norma Talmadge, and The Enchanted Cottage starring Richard Barthelmess and May McAvoy were released.
The Portuguese football club Sport Benfica e Castelo Branco was founded.
Born: Norman Fell, actor, in Philadelphia, Pennsylvania (d. 1998)
Died: Prince Kachō Hirotada of Japan, 22

March 25, 1924 (Tuesday)
The Greek Parliament voted to depose King George II and declare Greece a republic. A public referendum on the issue was set for April 13.
The Montreal Canadiens defeated the Calgary Tigers 3-0 to win the Stanley Cup, two games to none in a best-of-three series.
Born: Roberts Blossom, actor and poet, in New Haven, Connecticut (d. 2011)

March 26, 1924 (Wednesday)
French Prime Minister Raymond Poincaré resigned after his government was defeated in the Chamber of Deputies by a vote of 271 to 264. The confidence vote was a complete surprise and Poincaré was not even present, as he was in a committee meeting when it was announced and voted on.
Over 100 died in landslides around Amalfi, Italy.

March 27, 1924 (Thursday)
Raymond Poincaré accepted President Alexandre Millerand's request to form a new government.
Erich Ludendorff and Adolf Hitler made their final addresses as their trial for treason wound down in Munich.
Born: Sarah Vaughan, jazz singer, in Newark, New Jersey (d. 1990); Herbert Zangs, artist, in Krefeld, Germany (d. 2003)

March 28, 1924 (Friday)
U.S. Attorney General Harry M. Daugherty resigned over the Teapot Dome scandal.
Total S.A., one of the major energy product and sales companies worldwide, was founded in France, as predecessor name was Campagnie Francaise des Petroles. 
Born: Freddie Bartholomew, child actor, in London, England (d. 1992)

March 29, 1924 (Saturday)
A proposed settlement in the London tram and bus drivers' strike was submitted to union delegates. A vote was set for Monday.
Jews in Bucharest were targeted by rioters in nighttime attacks that continued into the next morning.  
Died: Charles Villiers Stanford, 71, Irish composer, conductor and teacher

March 30, 1924 (Sunday)
The German People's Party announced in its election platform that it stood for a "new democratic monarchy". One of their election slogans was, "We are fighting under the colours of the black, white and red".
Flooding in the U.S. states of Pennsylvania, West Virginia and Maryland killed 8 and did extensive damage.
The historical drama film Beau Brummel, starring John Barrymore, was released.
Born: Alan Davidson, food writer, in Derry, Northern Ireland (d. 2003)

March 31, 1924 (Monday)
The London tram and bus drivers' strike ended.
The air transport company Imperial Airways was founded.

References

1924
1924-03
1924-03